Grigorovo is a rural locality (a village) in Karinskoye Rural Settlement, Alexandrovsky District, Vladimir Oblast, Russia. The population was 102 as of 2010.

Geography 
The village is located 16 km south-west from Bolshoye Karinskoye, 21 km south-west from Alexandrov.

References 

Rural localities in Alexandrovsky District, Vladimir Oblast